Hyctiota is a genus of the jumping spiders found on the Moluccas in Indonesia. It is only described species is Hyctiota banda. Its taxonomic relationships within the family Salticidae are uncertain.

References

  (2007): The world spider catalog, version 8.0. American Museum of Natural History.

Salticidae
Taxa named by Embrik Strand
Arthropods of Indonesia
Spiders of Asia
Monotypic Salticidae genera